McGrady is a surname of Irish origin originating in Galway.  Notable people with this name include:

Barbara McGrady (born 1950) Indigenous Australian photographer
Eddie McGrady (born 1935), Northern Ireland nationalist politician
 Ewan McGrady, Australian rugby league footballer
 Kevin McGrady (born 1956), convicted Irish Republican Army member
 Martin McGrady (1946–2006), American sprinter
 Michael McGrady (born 1960), American actor
 Mike McGrady (1933–2012), American journalist and writer
 Niamh McGrady, Northern Irish actress
 Paul McGrady, college football coach
 Tony McGrady (born 1944), Australian politician
 Tracy McGrady (born 1979), American retired basketball player
 Ryan McGrady (Born 1982), Environmental Scientist

See also
Robert McGrady Blackburn (1919–2002), American bishop
McGrady Cove, a cove at the head of Newcomb Bay in the Windmill Islands

References

Surnames of Irish origin
Anglicised Irish-language surnames